is a Japanese footballer who plays as a forward for Malaysia Super League club Negeri Sembilan.

Club career
On 29 January 2022, Kagayama signed with Sabah in Malaysia. He played 30 matches in all competition for Sabah and provide 2 assist and 3 goals in the Malaysia Super League. He scored 2 goals in the Malaysia Cup to take Sabah to the semi-final. He left at the end of the season to return to Finland.

Career statistics

Club

Notes

References

Living people
1996 births
Japanese footballers
Kansai University alumni
Association football forwards
Ykkönen players
Veikkausliiga players
Musan Salama players
Kokkolan Palloveikot players
FC Inter Turku players
Sabah F.C. (Malaysia) players
Japanese expatriate footballers
Japanese expatriate sportspeople in Finland
Expatriate footballers in Finland
Japanese expatriate sportspeople in Malaysia
Expatriate footballers in Malaysia